Ashiana is a 1952 Hindi language romantic movie produced by B. Swinder Sabharwal. The film is directed by B. Trilochan. The film stars Raj Kapoor and  Nargis in lead roles along with Iftekhar, Randhir and Shivraj. The film's music was composed by Madan Mohan. The film was based on a story written by Arjun Dev Rashk.

Plot 
Raju and Gaura are living in a beautiful village that has hills and mountains subsiding near to the village. Both of them  were in love since their childhood and promised to hold together and get married. Jeevan a mutual friend of both Raju and Gaura becomes obsessed with Gaura and tries to part their relationship. He poisons Gaura's  father and later tries to bring a quarrel between Raju and his brother. But all of his efforts turns in vain. Later Raju gets imprisoned for murder of Jeevan when Raju saves Gaura from being assaulted by Jeevan. Gaura's father tries to get Gaura married to another young man in the village as he do not want his daughter to marry a murderer. Standing by the window while her father was convincing her to get married, Gaura gets killed falling through the window to the lake. Though no one informs Raju of Gaura's death at that moment, later when he came to know about the incident he never believes it. The main reason was that her body was not yet retrieved  from the lake. He kept looking for her but he was not disappointed unable to find her. He came upon the toy which he had made for her during their childhood. It was a symbol of their love. Later on he started seeing her and started talking to her as he looked at the toy. Thus the story is a clear picturisation of how true love remains even after death.

Cast 
 Raj Kapoor as Raju
 Nargis as Gaura
 Iftekhar as Jeevan
 Shivraj as Dwarkanath
 Randhir as Inder
 Surinder as Surinder Junior
 Master Ratan as Young Jeevan
 Ratan Gaurang as Young Raju
 Baby Sandhana as Young Gaura
 Om Sharma
 Mohana
 D S Dewan
 Kusum

Soundtrack

References

External links 
 

1952 films
Hindi-language romance films
Indian romantic drama films
1950s Hindi-language films
1952 romantic drama films
Indian black-and-white films